Rhamphini is a weevil tribe in the subfamily Curculioninae.

Genera 

 Dinorhopala Pascoe, 1860
 Imachra F.P.Pascoe, 1874
 Indodinorrhopalus Indodinorrhopalus H.R.Pajni & S.Sood, 1981
 Isochnus C.G.Thomson, 1859
 Ixalma F.P.Pascoe, 1871
 Laemorchestes G.C.Champion, 1903
 Macrorhynchaenus A.Hustache, 1933
 Megorchestes
 Morimotonomizo H.Kojima, 1997
 Orchestes Illiger, 1798
 Pritmus Pajni & Sood, 1981
 Pseudendaeus Voss, 1960
 Rhamphonyx E.Voss, 1964
 Rhamphus Clairville 1798
 Rhynchaenophaenus E.Voss, 1956
 Rhynchaenus Clairville 1798
 Sphaerorchestes K.Morimoto & S.Miyakawa, 1996
 Strabonus Kuschel, 2008
 Synorchestes E.Voss, 1958
 Tachyerges Schénherr, 1825
 Tachygonidius Champion, 1907
 Tachygonus Guérin-Ménéville, 1833
 Technites C.J.Schoenherr, 1843
 Viticis Lea & A.M., 1930

References 

 Rafinesque, C.S. 1815: Analyse de la nature, ou tableau de l'univers et des corps organisés. Palerme. L'Imprimerie de Jean Barravecchia. 224 pp.
 Kojima, H. 2011: Magorchestes, a new genus of Rhamphini (Coleoptera, Curculionidae) from Laos. Japanese journal of systematic entomology, 17(1): 109–113.
 Korotyaev B.A. 1994: New and a little known species of the weevil genus Rhamphus from Sri Lanka, Ethiopia and Namibia (Coleoptera: Curculionidae). Zoosystematica Rossica 3(1): 107–110.
 Korotyaev, B.A., 2012: New species of the weevil genus Pseudorchestes (Coleoptera, Curculionidae) from the central Palaearctic region. Entomological Review 92 (5): 593–598. Abstract: doi: 10.1134/S0013873812050132. Original Russian Text: Zoologicheskii Zhurnal, 2011, 90 (2): 243–248.
 Kuschel, G. 2008: Curculionoidea (weevils) of New Caledonia and Vanuatu: ancestral families and some Curculionidae. In: Grandcolas, P. (ed.), Zoologia Neocaledonica 6. Biodiversity studies in New Caledonia. Mémoires du Muséum national d’Histoire naturelle, 197: 99-250.  

Curculioninae
Polyphaga tribes